Émile Deville (25 January 1824 – 8 January 1853) was a French physician, naturalist and  taxidermist.

Emile Deville, already an employee of  Muséum national d'histoire naturelle, joined the 1843 expedition of Francis de Laporte de Castelnau (1810-1880) to South America with the doctor and botanist Hugh Algernon Weddell (1819-1877). He returned with many bird specimens, especially parrots, including two new species, Bonaparte's parakeet and the dusky-headed parakeet, which he described in 1851. He also described, with Isidore Geoffroy Saint-Hilaire, the white-tailed titi, and with de Castelnau, some crabs.

A number of species bear his name, such as the blaze-winged parakeet, Pyrrhura devillei and the striated antbird, Drymophila devillei.

The following are a few of the writings that are attributed to Deville:
 Description de quelques Mammifères et Oiseaux nouveaux de L'Amérique méridionale - Description of some new mammals and birds from South America.
 Note sur quatre espèces nouvelles d'oiseaux provenant de l'expédition de M. Castelnau - Note on four new species of birds from the Castelnau expedition.
 Considérations sur les avantages de la naturalisation en France de l'alpaca - Considerations on the advantages for naturalization of the alpaca in France.

References

Edward Julius Goodman, 1992 The Explorers of South America University of Oklahoma Press

19th-century French physicians
French naturalists
French zoologists
French ornithologists
1853 deaths
1824 births